Day for Night is a 1973 romantic comedy-drama film co-written and directed by François Truffaut, starring Jacqueline Bisset, Jean-Pierre Léaud and Truffaut himself. The original French title, La Nuit américaine ("American Night"), refers to the French name for the filmmaking process whereby sequences filmed outdoors in daylight are shot with a filter over the camera lens (a technique described in the dialogue of Truffaut's film) or also using film stock balanced for tungsten (indoor) light and underexposed (or adjusted during post-production) to appear as if they are taking place at night. In English, the technique is called day for night.

The film premiered out of competition at the 1973 Cannes Film Festival and won the Academy Award for Best Foreign Language Film the following year.

Plot
Day for Night chronicles the production of Je Vous Présente Paméla (Meet Pamela, or literally I Introduce You to Pamela), a clichéd melodrama starring aging screen icon Alexandre, former diva Séverine, young heartthrob Alphonse and British actress Julie Baker, who is recovering from both a nervous breakdown and the controversy over her marriage to her much older doctor.

In between are several vignettes chronicling the stories of the crew members and the director, Ferrand, who deals with the practical problems of making a film. Behind the camera, the actors and crew experience several romances, affairs, break-ups and sorrows. The production is especially shaken up when one of the supporting actresses is revealed to be pregnant. Later, Alphonse's lover leaves him for the film's stuntman, which leads Alphonse into a palliative one-night stand with an accommodating Julie; thereupon, mistaking Julie's pity for true love, the infantile Alphonse informs Julie's husband of the affair. Finally, Alexandre dies on the way to hospital after a car accident.

Cast

Cast notes:
 Author Graham Greene makes a cameo appearance as an insurance company representative, billed as "Henry Graham". On the film's DVD, it was reported that Greene was a great admirer of Truffaut, and had always wanted to meet him, so when the small part came up where he actually talks to the director, he was delighted to have the opportunity. It was reported that Truffaut was disappointed he was not told until later that the actor playing the insurance company representative was Greene, as he would have liked to have made his acquaintance, being an admirer of Greene's work.

Production
The film was based on an original idea by Truffaut who said he wanted the picture to do for film what Fahrenheit 451 did for books "to show why it is good to love the cinema". The film was shot in Nice on an enormous set for a Paris street originally built by an American company and used for Lady L (1965) and The Madwoman of Chaillot (1969). Truffaut got the idea while editing Two English Girls (1971).

Truffaut used international actors because he felt French cinema did not have the mythological aspect he wanted. He said the film was influenced by The Golden Coach and Singin' in the Rain (both 1952); the latter was his favourite film about filmmaking because it showed everyone involved in a film, not just the director and star.

Bisset was cast in part because she spoke French. "I was so flattered when he [Truffaut] called", said Bisset. "It's wonderful to work with someone who likes working with women".

The film was dedicated to the Gish sisters, whom Truffaut called "the first two actresses of the cinema"; he said the film was made in "the spirit of friendship for all the people in the movie business".

Truffaut took a sabbatical after making the film.

Themes
One of the film's themes is whether cinema is more important than life to those who make it. It makes many allusions both to filmmaking and to movies themselves, perhaps unsurprisingly since Truffaut began his career as a film critic who championed cinema as an art form. The film opens with a picture of Lillian and Dorothy Gish, to whom it is dedicated. In one scene, Ferrand opens a package of books he has ordered on directors such as Luis Buñuel, Carl Theodor Dreyer, Ingmar Bergman, Alfred Hitchcock, Howard Hawks, Jean-Luc Godard, Ernst Lubitsch, Roberto Rossellini and Robert Bresson. The film's French title could sound like L'ennui américain ("American boredom"): Truffaut wrote elsewhere of the way French cinema critics inevitably make this pun of any title that uses nuit. Here, he deliberately invites his viewers to recognise the artificiality of cinema, particularly American-style studio film, with its reliance on effects such as day for night, that Je Vous Présente Paméla exemplifies.

Reception
The film is often considered one of Truffaut's best. It is one of two Truffaut films on Time magazine's list of the 100 Best Films of the Century, along with The 400 Blows (1959). It has also been called "the most beloved film ever made about filmmaking".

Roger Ebert gave the film four stars out of four, writing, "it is not only the best movie ever made about the movies but is also a great entertainment." He added it to his "The Great Movies" list in 1997. Vincent Canby of The New York Times called the film "hilarious, wise and moving," with "superb" performances. Gene Siskel of the Chicago Tribune gave the film four stars out of four, calling it "a movie about the making of a movie; it also is a wonderfully tender story of the fragile, funny, and tough people who populate the film business." He named it the best film of 1973 in his year-end list. Pauline Kael of The New Yorker called the film "a return to form" for Truffaut, "though it's a return only to form." She added, "It has a pretty touch. But when it was over, I found myself thinking, Can this be all there is to it? The picture has no center and not much spirit." Charles Champlin of the Los Angeles Times called it "one of the most sheerly enjoyable movies of any year, for any audience. For those who love the movies as Truffault loves them, 'Day for Night' is a very special testament of that love." Richard Combs of The Monthly Film Bulletin wrote, "Easily classifiable as a lightweight work, and never digging much below the surface of either its characters or its director's particular concept of cinema, the film still manages to be an  delight simply because of the élan and ingenious craftsmanship with which its traditionally dangerous, self-conscious format is handled."

Jean-Luc Godard walked out of Day for Night in disgust, and accused Truffaut of making a film that was a "lie". Truffaut responded with a long letter critical of Godard, and the two former friends never met again.

Awards and nominations

See also
 List of French submissions for the Academy Award for Best Foreign Language Film
 List of submissions to the 46th Academy Awards for Best Foreign Language Film
 List of films featuring fictional films

References

External links
 
 
 
 
 Day for Night: Are Movies Magic? – an essay by David Cairns at The Criterion Collection

1973 films
1973 comedy-drama films
1973 romantic drama films
1970s French films
1970s French-language films
1970s Italian films
1970s romantic comedy-drama films
Best Film BAFTA Award winners
Best Foreign Language Film Academy Award winners
Films about filmmaking
Films directed by François Truffaut
Films partially in color
Films scored by Georges Delerue
Films set in Nice
Films shot in Nice
Films whose director won the Best Direction BAFTA Award
Films with screenplays by François Truffaut
French romantic comedy-drama films
Italian romantic comedy-drama films
National Society of Film Critics Award for Best Film winners